Canim Lake  is a lake in British Columbia, Canada. "Canim" means a type of large canoe in the Chinook Jargon. It is also part of the territory of the Shuswap First Nation where the ancestors are part of the Lake Division of the Shuswap nation of the Interior Nations of British Columbia. The Reilly Commission states that the 2,029 hectares region around Canim Lake are set aside for the Shuswap First Nation. In the summer of 1995, there was an archaeological evidence of an ancient civilization and evidence of carbon dated as 4,300 old.

Activities
Canim Lake is known for its summer and winter activities. During the summer, recreational activities include fishing, hiking, horseback riding, cliff jumping, water skiing, canoeing and kayaking. Multiple resorts located around the lake provide horse adventures for both novice and experienced riders; options include overnight and multi-day trips. Hiking and mountain biking are also common summer activities in the surrounding backcountry.  Canim Lake is also a well known area for freshwater fishing. Many types of fish can be caught including kokanee, rainbow trout, lake trout, and burbot. Wildlife are often seen around the lake and include black bears, moose, deer, wolves, foxes, cougars, beavers, otters, migratory waterfowl, osprey, bald eagles and song birds. 
Winter activities include snowmobiling, cross-country skiing, dogsledding and ice fishing.

Places to See
Canim Falls can be reached from the south side of the lake. The Canim River has cut into a lava plateau that came from the Wells Gray Clearwater Volcanic Field. The falls are located in Wells Gray Provincial Park.

Provincial Parks and BC Recreation Sites around Canim Lake

Canim Beach Provincial Park
Wells Gray Provincial Park
Schoolhouse Lake Provincial Park
Howard Lake Recreation Site
Christmas Lake Recreation Site
Succour Lake Recreation Site
Paddy Lake Recreation Site
Greenlee Lake Recreation Site
Hendrix Creek Falls Recreation Site

Private Resorts and Campsites

South Point Resort www.southpointresort.ca 
Canim Lake Resort
KAYANARA Guest Ranch & Resort
Rainbow Resort
Reynolds Resort
Minac Holliday Village (Closed)

Fishing

Canim Lake contains numerous fish species including Rainbow Trout, Lake Trout, Kokanee and Burbot.  Online records indicate between 1938 and 1998, the Government of British Columbia stocked Canim Lake (sporadically) with hatchery reared Kokanee and Rainbow Trout.  Since 1998 all fish species in Canim Lake are self-sustaining.

Settlement

The settlement Canim Lake of the Canim Lake Band is located west of the lake.

References

External links

Canim Lake at BC Adventure (Tourism)

Lakes of the Cariboo
Chinook Jargon place names
Lillooet Land District